Lepturichthys is a small genus of hillstream loaches endemic to China.

Species
There are currently two recognized species in this genus:
 Lepturichthys dolichopterus D. Y. Dai, 1985
 Lepturichthys fimbriata (Günther, 1888)

References

Balitoridae